Milind Mulick is a watercolour artist based in Pune, India. His work has been shown at exhibitions internationally as well as all over India.  He has had an influence on new Indian painters such as Sujith Sudhi and Bijay Biswaal.

Mulick has authored many books on painting and also teaches painting in India and internationally.

Family and early life
Milind is the son of famed Indian illustrator and comics artist Pratap Mulick. He started painting when he was five years old, and at the age of thirteen his watercolour landscapes earned him the National Talent Scholarship to study painting. However, he chose to enrol in the College of Engineering, Pune instead of taking up his place in the National Institute of Design, Ahmedabad, and went on to graduate in engineering. He states that his engineering course has helped him to analyse methods of painting and has benefitted his watercolour technique.

Career
After graduating, he worked as an illustrator for an architectural firm for about fifteen years while still pursuing watercolour painting, and became a full-time artist in 1995 with an exhibition in Pune. He has since had solo exhibitions in Mumbai, Sweden, France, Spain, Singapore, Mauritius and Russia. His paintings are in demand for corporate offices and private collectors in the US, Europe, Japan and Singapore, and have been selected for numerous watercolour society exhibitions including three consecutive years with the American Watercolor Society.

Mulick runs watercolour classes and workshops in India, Europe and locations in Asia. He also gives watercolour demonstrations at government art colleges in Maharashtra.

Books
Mulick has written twelve books in both English and Marathi, including books explaining watercolour techniques in a simple way, to fill a perceived gap in the market. His first book, Watercolour, published in 2000 in both English and Marathi, has now sold over 100,000 copies.

The English editions of his books are:
Watercolour, 2nd edition, 15th reprint
Watercolour Landscapes Step by Step, including a DVD of demonstrations, 1st edition, 8th reprint
Sketchbook, 1st edition, 12th reprint
Milind Mulick @HOME, 1st edition
Methods and Techniques - Opaque Colour, 2nd edition, 3rd reprint
Natural Inspiration, 1st edition, 2nd reprint
Watercolour Demonstrations, 1st edition, 2nd reprint
Perspective, 1st edition, 10th reprint
Varanasi - An artist's impression, 1st edition, 1st reprint
Watercolour Paintings with Photo References, 1st edition
Journey so far..., 1st edition

Music
Mulick was one of the three founder members of the rock band The Strangers, formed in 1982. He was lead vocalist and played the guitar. They won the inter-collegiate rock music contest Livewire in Mumbai in 1984 and went on to play at college and corporate events across India.

References

External links
 

Living people
Year of birth missing (living people)
Place of birth missing (living people)
Artists from Pune
Indian watercolourists